The Amott test is one of the most widely used empirical wettability measurements for reservoir cores in petroleum engineering. The method combines two spontaneous imbibition measurements and two forced displacement measurements. This test defines two different indices: the Amott water index and the Amott oil index.

Amott–Harvey index
The two Amott indices are often combined to give the Amott–Harvey index. It is a number between −1 and 1 describing wettability of a rock in drainage processes. It is defined as:

These two indices are obtained from special core analysis (SCAL) experiments (porous plate or centrifuge) by plotting the capillary pressure curve as a function of the water saturation as shown on figure 1:

A rock is defined as:
 Water wet when the Amott–Harvey index is between 0.3 and 1, 
 Weakly water wet when the Amott–Harvey index is between 0 and 0.3, 
 Weakly oil wet when the Amott–Harvey index is between −0.3 and 0, 
 Oil wet when the Amott–Harvey index is between −1 and −0.3.

See also
 Capillary pressure
 Imbibition
 Leverett J-function
 Multiphase flow
 Relative permeability
 TEM-function
 Rise in core – An alternate Reservoir Wettability Characterization Method
 Lak wettability index
 USBM wettability index

References
 Dake, L.P., "Fundamentals of Reservoir Engineering", Elsevier Scientific Publishing Company, Amsterdam, 1977.
 Amott, E., "Observations relating to the wettability of porous rock", Trans. AIME 219, pp. 156–162, 1959.
Petroleum engineering

External links
 Fluid flow in porous media : facts
 Fundamentals of Wettability
 Multi-phase Saturated Rock Properties: Wettability: Laboratory Determination